Parkesburg School is a historic school building located at Parkesburg, Chester County, Pennsylvania.  It was built in three sections; the oldest dating to 1899–1900, with additions made in 1916 and 1958–1959. The oldest section is a two-story, rectangular brick building in the Italian Renaissance Revival style. It is nine bays by four bays and has a dual pitched hipped roof. The 1916 addition is two stories and in the Colonial Revival style.  The 1958–1959 addition is a one-story, rectangular brick structure attached to the main building by a narrow ell-shaped connector wing. It has been converted into a retirement home.

It was added to the National Register of Historic Places in 1995.

References

School buildings on the National Register of Historic Places in Pennsylvania
Colonial Revival architecture in Pennsylvania
Renaissance Revival architecture in Pennsylvania
School buildings completed in 1959
Schools in Chester County, Pennsylvania
National Register of Historic Places in Chester County, Pennsylvania